The following is a timeline of the history of the city of Virginia Beach, Virginia, USA.

Prior to 20th century

 1607 - English colonists land on beach.
 1639 - Lynnhaven Parish Church built.
 1720 - Adam Thoroughgood House built (approximate date).
 1736 - Old Donation Episcopal Church built.
 1750 - Kempsville district established as Kemps Landing (approximate date).
 1775 - Battle of Kemp's Landing
 1781 - September 5: Battle of the Chesapeake.
 1791 - Nimmo Church constructed. It is the oldest church with the original foundation in the area. Bishop Francis Asbury preached there.[10]
 1810 - Francis Land House built (approximate date).
 1879 - Cape Henry Lighthouse built.
 1888 - Oceanfront Boardwalk built.
 1891 -  Norwegian ship Dictator wrecked offshore.
 1900 - Population: 11,192.

20th century

 1906 - Town of Virginia Beach incorporated.
 1933 - Bayne Theatre opens (approximate date).
 1935 - Cape Henry Memorial erected.
 1941 - The Virginia Beach and Princess Anne Chapters of the NAACP were formed.
 1952 - City of Virginia Beach incorporated.
 1953 - August: Hurricane Barbara.
 1960 - Population: 84,215.
 1963 - City merges with Princess Anne County.
 1964 - Chesapeake Bay Bridge–Tunnel opens.
 1970 - Population: 172,106.
 1980 - Population: 262,199.
 1988 - Meyera E. Oberndorf becomes mayor.
 1989 - Virginia Museum of Contemporary Art opens.
 1990 - Population: 393,069.
 2000 - City website online (approximate date).

21st century

 2009 - Will Sessoms becomes mayor.
 2010 - Population: 437,994 in city; 1,676,822 in Virginia Beach-Norfolk-Newport News, VA-NC Metropolitan Statistical Area.
 2019 - The Virginia Beach shooting occurs.

See also
 History of Virginia Beach, Virginia
 List of mayors of Virginia Beach, Virginia
 National Register of Historic Places listings in Virginia Beach, Virginia
 History of Hampton Roads area
 Timelines of other cities in Virginia: Alexandria, Hampton, Lynchburg, Newport News, Norfolk, Portsmouth, Richmond, Roanoke

References

  10. "Nimmo Church". Princess Anne County/Virginia Beach Historical Society. Retrieved 2010-09-05.

Bibliography

External links

 Items related to Virginia Beach, various dates (via Digital Public Library of America)

 
Virginia Beach